The Twelve Brothers in Silk, also known as The Silk Brothers, is a group of fictional comic book villains, a family of killers that have fought the Birds of Prey in the DC Comics Universe. They were created by artist Joe Bennett and writer Gail Simone.

Fictional history

The Twelve Brothers in Silk, 12 martial artists named after the signs of the Chinese Zodiac, first appeared in the employ of Mister Tan, a Singaporean drug lord. Posing as American mobsters, Wildcat and Black Canary attempted to fool Mister Tan into selling them all of his drugs, which would ultimately cripple his operations while simultaneously depriving the real American Mafia of one of their main drug suppliers.

Led by Huang Chao Ran, the brother known as Rabbit, the Twelve Brothers monitored Black Canary and Wildcat during these dealings, attempting to determine if they were legitimate. Their attempts to force Canary and Wildcat to reveal their true identities failed, and culminated in a spar between Rabbit and Black Canary that was interrupted by a furious Mister Tan.

Mister Tan realized that he had been set up after agreeing to the terms that Black Canary stipulated, and in an attempt to avoid being ruined, he arranged for a real mob group to buy his drug shipment. The Twelve Brothers accompanied the shipment to protect it, and met Black Canary and a group of fighters in America. The two groups agreed to a duel.

Black Canary's team consisted of Wildcat, Richard Dragon, Green Arrow II (Connor Hawke), Savant, Creote, Huntress, and herself. Before the fight could end in one side's clear defeat, however, Black Canary signaled her teammate Lady Blackhawk to attack the drug shipment, destroying it. Black Canary then gave Rabbit an ultimatum: with the shipment destroyed he had already failed in his mission. The only way the brothers could be sure to walk away with their record of never losing intact was to call a draw. Rabbit agreed, and the groups parted ways.

White Canary

During the Birds of Prey relaunch tie-in with the 2010 Brightest Day storyline, one of the female children born to Huang was spared after lightning appeared on the day of her birth and killed her midwife, making Huang believe that something powerful wanted her to live. She was trained by her brothers in the same techniques, and after their defeat at the hands of Black Canary, she hunted them down and killed them for dishonoring their father's name. Now calling herself White Canary, she traveled to Gotham and set to blackmail Black Canary by revealing her secret identity and threatening to kill one teammate for each hour that passed, enlisting the help of Oswald Cobblepot, Savant and Creote. Upon being defeated by Black Canary, she denied being responsible for the death of a kidnapper in Iceland to frame Black Canary, claiming that it was in fact Lady Shiva, and offers Black Canary help in killing Shiva if she is set free.

Later, White Canary takes Black Canary to Bangkok and reveals that she is holding Black Canary's adopted daughter Sin as a hostage, and will kill her if Black Canary does not battle Lady Shiva in a duel to the death. Black Canary agrees despite her broken wrist, but at the last minute Helena Bertinelli challenges Shiva in her place, buying Black Canary enough time to find Sin and get her to safety, and Lady Shiva agrees to put their duel off until a later time. White Canary reluctantly concedes, but promises that Black Canary has not seen the last of her.

Powers and abilities
Each of the Twelve Brothers in Silk is considered almost Lady Shiva-level in skill. Given that they fight as a group, this makes them one of the most feared forces in the criminal world.

They allow themselves no alcohol, women or other "vices" except for fighting. They value honor highly, and Black Canary both exploited this and was careful to respect it — they would do anything to avoid "losing face", but to dishonor them would mean making a powerful enemy for life.

Although they fight side by side, their greatest weakness is supposedly that they do not really care about one another.

References

Black Canary characters
Characters created by Gail Simone
Comics characters introduced in 2005
DC Comics martial artists
DC Comics supervillain teams
Fictional families
Fictional duodecets
Works about brothers